The 2002–03 Slovenian Ice Hockey League was the 12th season of the Slovenian Hockey League. Olimpija have won the league championships.

First round

Playoffs

Final round

Final
11 March 2003, Olimpija – Jesenice: 2–3 (1–1, 1–0, 0–2)
13 March 2003, Olimpija  – Jesenice: 3–1 (0–0, 2–1, 1–0)
16 March 2003, Jesenice – Olimpija : 3–4 (0–2, 2–0, 1–2)
18 March 2003, Jesenice – Olimpija : 3–4 n.V. (1–1, 2–0, 0–2, 0–1)
20 March 2003, Olimpija  – Jesenice: 7–2 (2–0, 3–2, 2–0)

3rd place
22 March 2003, Slavija – Bled: 2–3 (1–0, 0–0, 1–3) 
25 March 2003, Slavija  – Bled: 9–1 (2–1, 6–0, 1–0)
28 March 2003, Bled – Slavija : 1–6 (1–2, 0–1, 0–3)
31 March 2003, Bled – Slavija : 1–6 (1–2, 0–3, 0–1)

5th place

External links
Slovenian league 2002–03

1
Slovenia
Slovenian Ice Hockey League seasons